Jean-Louis Jeanmaire (25 March 1910 in Biel/Bienne – 29 January 1992) was a brigadier in the Swiss army who passed highly classified Swiss military secrets to the Soviet Union from 1962 up until his retirement at 65 in 1975.

Background and significant events

He was recruited as a spy by Colonel Vassily Denissenko, the Soviet air attaché.

He never accepted money for the information he passed to the Soviets; his motivation appeared to be the result of bitterness at being passed over for promotion.

He was sentenced to a prison term of eighteen years but served only twelve due to good conduct.  Jeanmaire was released from prison in 1988, and died of natural causes in 1992 in Bern.

Literature
 Urs Widmer: Jeanmaire: ein Stück Schweiz. Verlag der Autoren, Frankfurt am Main 1992 –  (play)
 John le Carré: Unbearable peace. Harmondsworth 1991 – 
 Jürg Schoch: Fall Jeanmaire, Fall Schweiz. Wie Politik und Medien einen «Jahrhundertverräter» fabrizierten. «hier + jetzt», Verlag für Kultur und Geschichte, Baden 2006 –

References

External links

1910 births
1992 deaths
People from Biel/Bienne
Swiss generals
People convicted of spying for the Soviet Union
Academic staff of ETH Zurich